Clavus flammulatus, common name the flame turrid, is a species of sea snail, a marine gastropod mollusk in the family Drilliidae.

Description
The size of an adult shell varies between 25 mm and 50 mm. The shell is whitish, with chestnut longitudinal streaks, forming bands interrupted by the ribs, often chestnut-spotted between the tubercles.

Distribution
This species occurs in the Indian Ocean off East Africa and in the Central Pacific Ocean; also off Australia (Western Australia).

References

 Montfort, P.D. de 1810. Conchyliologie Systematique, et Classification Methodique des Coquilles. Paris : F. Schoell Vol. 2 676 + 16 pp.
 Cernohorsky, W.O. 1978. Tropical Pacific Marine Shells. Sydney : Pacific Publications 352 pp., 68 pls.
 Michel, C. (1988). Marine molluscs of Mauritius. Editions de l'Ocean Indien. Stanley, Rose Hill. Mauritius 
 Wells, F.E. 1991. A revision of the Recent Australian species of the turrid genera Clavus, Plagiostropha, and Tylotiella (Mollusca: Gastropoda). Journal of the Malacological Society of Australasia 12: 1–33 
 Wilson, B. 1994. Australian Marine Shells. Prosobranch Gastropods. Kallaroo, WA : Odyssey Publishing Vol. 2 370 pp.
 Tucker, J.K. 2004 Catalog of recent and fossil turrids (Mollusca: Gastropoda). Zootaxa 682:1–1295.

External links
 

flammulatus
Gastropods described in 1810